Wyndham Raymond Portal, 1st Viscount Portal,  (9 April 1885 – 6 May 1949), was a British politician.

The eldest son of Sir William Wyndam Portal, 2nd Baronet, and Florence Elizabeth Mary Glyn, daughter of Hon. St Leger Glyn, 2nd son of George Glyn, 1st Baron Wolverton, he was educated at Eton and Christ Church, Oxford. In 1909 he married Lady Louise Rosemary Kathleen Virginia Cairns, only child of Arthur Cairns, 2nd Earl Cairns.

He was commissioned into the Hampshire Yeomanry in 1903, was promoted lieutenant in 1905, and transferred to the 9th Lancers later the same year. He transferred to the 1st Life Guards as a second lieutenant in 1908 and was promoted lieutenant again later the same year, but left the Army in 1911. He rejoined the Hampshire Yeomanry in 1914 and served in World War I. He was promoted captain in 1914 while serving as adjutant of the Royal 1st Devon Yeomanry. Transferring back to the Life Guards (Special Reserve) in 1915, he was promoted lieutenant-colonel in 1916 when he took command of the Household Battalion. In 1917, he was awarded the Distinguished Service Order and appointed a Member of the Royal Victorian Order (MVO).

He relinquished command of the battalion in 1918 and reverted to the rank of captain, but was soon promoted major and attached to the Machine Gun Corps as a battalion commander, again with the rank of lieutenant-colonel. He resigned his commission in 1919.

Returning to civilian life, he became chairman of the Portal family's banknote paper mill company in Laverstoke, Portals Limited, in 1919 which had manufactured banknote paper for the Bank of England since 1724. and became the company's chairman when his father died in 1931. 
In 1936, he was one of the main investors in J. Arthur Rank's General Cinema Finance Corporation, the company which one year later would become the British film industry's most important company, The Rank Organisation. He became General Cinema Finance Corporation's chairman, and worked very closely with J. Arthur Rank for many years.  

Portal succeeded to his father's baronetcy in 1931. In 1935 he was raised to the peerage as Baron Portal, of Laverstoke. He was appointed a Privy Counsellor in 1942, created Viscount Portal in 1945 and appointed a Knight Grand Cross of the Order of St Michael and St George in 1949 

In 1935, he was made chairman of the Bacon Development Board, and, in April 1939, he was made was regional commissioner for Wales under the Civil Defence Scheme. In 1940, he became the chairman of the Coal Production Council, and he served in government as Additional Parliamentary Secretary to the Ministry of Supply from 1940 to 1942, and as Minister of Works and Planning from 1942 to 1944.  

In 1935, he accepted the chairmanship of the British Olympic Association and thus led the British team in the 1936 Olympic games in Berlin. That experience made him the perfect president of the 1948 Olympic Games in London. 

After the war, in 1945, he became the last chairman of the Great Western Railway, and Lord Lieutenant of Hampshire from 1947. He was succeeded to the baronetcy by his uncle, Sir Spencer Portal, 4th Baronet.

References

Who Was Who (UK)

|-

1885 births
1949 deaths
9th Queen's Royal Lancers officers
Alumni of Christ Church, Oxford
British Army personnel of World War I
British Life Guards officers
British people of World War II
Companions of the Distinguished Service Order
Hampshire Yeomanry officers
Knights Grand Cross of the Order of St Michael and St George
Lord-Lieutenants of Hampshire
Machine Gun Corps officers
Members of the Privy Council of the United Kingdom
Members of the Royal Victorian Order
Ministers in the Churchill wartime government, 1940–1945
Royal 1st Devon Yeomanry officers
Barons created by George V
Viscounts created by George VI
People from Laverstoke
People educated at Eton College